libdash is a computer software library which provides an object-oriented interface to the Dynamic Adaptive Streaming over HTTP (DASH) standard. It is also the official reference implementation of the ISO/IEC MPEG-DASH standard, and maintained by the Austrian company bitmovin. The libdash source code is open source, published at GitHub, and licensed under the GNU Lesser General Public License 2.1+.

The project contains a Qt-based sample multimedia player that is based on ffmpeg which uses libdash for the playback of DASH streams.

References

External links 
 

Video libraries
Free video conversion software
Free codecs
Multimedia frameworks
C++ libraries
Cross-platform free software
Free software programmed in C++
Free computer libraries